"My Hood" is a song by American hip hop recording artist Young Jeezy, released December 11, 2005 as the fourth single from his debut studio album Let's Get It: Thug Motivation 101 (2005). The song, produced by Grand Hustle in-house producer Cordale "Lil' C" Quinn, contains an interpolation of "Rubber Band Man" as performed by T.I.

The music video, directed by Hype Williams, is in black and white, with a few pockets of color. "My Hood" was Derek Jeter's walk-out music for his at bats during the 2006 Major League baseball season.

Chart positions

2005 singles
Music videos directed by Hype Williams
Jeezy songs
Songs written by Jeezy
Gangsta rap songs
Songs written by Lil' C (record producer)